Halsey Estate-Tallwood is a historic home located at West Hills in Suffolk County, New York, known locally as "Tallwood" but more formally known as the "Halsey Estate". It was built in 1925 and is a symmetrically arranged, 22-bay shingled residence with a central block and a series of either gable or gambrel roofs and varies in height from  stories to  stories.  The central -story block is five bays wide and has a gambrel roof.  It is representative of the Colonial Revival style.  Its builder, Richard Townley Haines Halsey, was a partner in Teff, Halsey and Company, brokers, and W. J. Sloane Company.  It has been used since the 1970s as a children's day camp.

It was added to the National Register of Historic Places in 1985.

References

External links
West Hills Day Camp (Official Site)

Houses on the National Register of Historic Places in New York (state)
Colonial Revival architecture in New York (state)
Houses completed in 1925
Houses in Suffolk County, New York
National Register of Historic Places in Suffolk County, New York